The Very Best of Richard Clapton is the second greatest hits album by Australian rock musician Richard Clapton. The album was released in April 1982 and peaked at number 18 on the Kent Music Report Albums Chart.

Background and release
From 1973-1980, Clapton released six studio albums with Infinity /Festival before signing with 
WEA for the release of The Great Escape which was released in February 1982 and peaked at number 7 and scored Clapton his second top twenty single "I Am an Island". As a result, Infinity/Festival released another greatest hits collection.

Track listing

Charts

Release history

References 

Richard Clapton albums
1982 compilation albums
Compilation albums by Australian artists
Festival Records compilation albums
Albums produced by Richard Batchens